The Los Angeles County Metropolitan Transportation Authority (Metro) operates six rail lines as part of its Metro Rail system. This system includes 5 light rail lines and 2 heavy rail lines. The agency owns, operates, and maintains a fleet of over 450 rail vehicles to operate these services.

Rail vehicles

Current fleet 
Metro operates two main types of rail vehicles: heavy rail vehicles and light rail vehicles. Metro's heavy rail vehicles, used on the B and D Lines, are  electric multiple unit, married-pair cars, powered by electrified third rail, that typically run in four or six-car consists. Metro's light rail vehicles, used on the A, C, E, K and L Lines, are  articulated double-ended vehicles, powered by overhead lines, which typically run in two or three vehicle consists.

Future fleet

Retired fleet

Rail facilities

Current rail facilities 
Rail vehicles are maintained at several facilities across Los Angeles County:

Planned rail facilities 
Metro is planning to build new rail facilities over the next few years.

 A new facility will be built in the San Fernando Valley west of Van Nuys Blvd south of the Metrolink tracks as part of the planned East San Fernando Light Rail line.
 An additional facility is being studied for either Bellflower or Paramount to support operations on the West Santa Ana Branch Transit Corridor.

See also 
 Los Angeles Metro Bus fleet
 Los Angeles County Metro Rail
 Los Angeles County Metropolitan Transportation Authority

Notes

References

External links 
 

rolling stock
Lists of rolling stock